Vinton Freedley (November 5, 1891 – June 5, 1969) was an American theater and television producer known for his productions of the works of Cole Porter, George Gershwin, Richard Rodgers and television shows such as Talent Jackpot and Showtime U.S.A..

Early life and education
Freedley was born in Philadelphia, Pennsylvania.  He graduated Harvard University in 1914 where he was a member of The Delphic Club and The Hasty Pudding.  He later attended The University of Pennsylvania where he earned a JD degree. He later became a member of the historic theatrical club, The Lambs in 1918

Producing
Soon after graduating college, Freedley met Alexander A. Aarons with whom he formed a long term producing partnership.  Their first major hit was Lady Be Good! (1924) with music and lyrics by George and Ira Gershwin and featuring Fred Astaire and Adele Astaire. Over the next ten years the pair produced some of the most important works in the Broadway musical canon, featuring some of the most famous songs ever to emerge from the Tin Pan Alley era, part of what is commonly referred to as "The Great American Songbook."  The shows that followed included  Tip-Toes (1925), Oh, Kay! (1926), and Funny Face (1927), again starring the Astaires. All the scores were written by the Gershwins. In 1928 Aarons and Freedley produced Here's Howe, featuring the music of Gus Kahn, Joseph Meyer, and Irving Caesar; Hold Everything!, with a score by Buddy DeSylva and Lew Brown; and Treasure Girl, with music by the Gershwins. In 1929 followed Spring Is Here and Heads Up!, both with songs by Richard Rodgers and Lorenz Hart. Another Gershwin hit was Girl Crazy (1930). The partnership ended in 1932.  Freedley produced 30 shows total on Broadway.

Alvin Theatre
Aarons and Freedley built the Alvin Theatre, today known as the Neil Simon Theatre.  It is a Broadway theater on 52nd Street in New York City with a capacity that fluctuates between 1400 and 1500 depending on the seating configuration.  The theatre was designed by architect Herbert J. Krapp.  The original name is a portmanteau of the names of the two producers: Alex Aarons and Vinton Freedley.

Broadway productions

Television
Showtime, U.S.A., TV Series 1950, Emcee
Talent Jackpot, TV Series 1949, Emcee
Stage Door Canteen, 1943
A Dangerous Affair, 1919

Notes

1891 births
1969 deaths
Television producers from Pennsylvania
American theatre managers and producers
University of Pennsylvania Law School alumni
Businesspeople from Philadelphia
Hasty Pudding alumni
20th-century American businesspeople